Karen Elizabeth Todner (born April 1962 in Nuneaton, England) is a British solicitor. Her clients include hacker Ryan Cleary linked with LulzSec, Gary McKinnon known as the "Pentagon Hacker", and Lauri Love.

Career
Todner qualified as a solicitor in 1987 and in her 20s became a founding member of Kaim Todner LLP, a law firm in London. Kaim Todner solicitors was formed in 1990 specialising in criminal law, with particular expertise in extradition. In the beginning of March 2016 Todner's practise was acquired by One Legal, an Alternative business structure originally set up in 2013. This came shortly after Todner announced her intention to close the practice due to Legal Aid cuts. Since acquisition by One Legal, Todner's firm Kaim Todner continued operating under the same name as part of One Legal alternative business. Karen left Kaim Todner and One Legal in September 2017.  Karen continues to practice and can be found at Karentodner.com. She is a regular commentator on criminal law and extradition.

Notable cases

Gary McKinnon

Todner appeared in a number of extradition cases. An early case was her successful defence of Gary McKinnon, which has set a new legal precedent in British law. McKinnon's legal team applied for a judicial review into the Home Secretary's rejection of medical evidence, which stated that, when he could easily be tried in the UK, it was unnecessary, cruel and inhumane to inflict the further stress of removing him from his homeland, his family and his medical support network.

Lauri Love

Starting in the winter of 2013, Todner started representing Lauri Love, British student who was arrested on suspicion of hacking into US military computers. Love is accused of committing the cyber attacks as part of a "hacktivist" campaign in 2012 and 2013 to protest the death of Aaron Swartz, a computer programmer who committed suicide while facing up to 35 years in US prison for charges of computer misuse. In September 2016 decision has been made to extradite Love to US. Todner said she's "as confident as I can be" about the appeal. More than 100 MPs showed support for Love's campaign to have his extradition order overturned on health grounds. In October 2016 it was announced that MP Barry Sheerman, chair of the Parliamentary Commission on Autism will write to President Obama, asking him to throw out the extradition request before he leaves office in January 2017. On Wednesday 12 October 2016, in the House of Commons during the Prime Ministers Questions, David Burrowes MP raised the case of Lauri Love and issues such as the difficulties faced by those with various forms of autism when they come into contact with the justice system. Others, including the National Autistic Society, Liberty, and The Courage Foundation, showed their support for Love's appeal. By 24 October, 105 cross-party backbenchers signed a letter to President Obama, raising "deep concern for safety" of Lauri Love, pointing out that he has "a long history of serious mental health issues, depression and some episodes of psychosis". In November 2016 Home Secretary Amber Rudd has backed decision to extradite Love to America.
Todner stated she fears he will be driven to suicide if extradited, and is lodging an appeal against Home Office's decision. In a letter to the Home Office opposing Love's extradition because of the risk of suicide, she wrote "We.. urge you to recognise the seriousness of Mr Love's mental illness and withdraw the request for extradition to permit prosecution to proceed in England, where Mr Love would be able to stand trial on bail with the support of his close family and medical support network." Love said Home Secretary should have refused to send him to the US for trial and called Home Secretary's decision to extradite him an ‘aberration of justice’ as his legal team Kaim Todner solicitors pointed out that no other UK citizen accused of hacking had been extradited to the US. Todner also stated that the Home Secretary should have refused to extradite Love because UK–US extradition treaty of 2003 is unfair and should be repealed. On 25 April 2017 High Court accepted Love's appeal against extradition, lodged by Todner on his behalf. No hearing date has yet been set, however Todner commented: "The reason permission has been granted is that the High Court acknowledge that the grounds raised some issues of great importance. We are delighted for these news for Lauri and will continue to do everything we can to ensure prevention of his extradition to the United States of America."

David McIntyre

Starting in 2012 Todner represented David McIntyre, Queen's Lancashire Regiment soldier and a war veteran who served in Afghanistan, Bosnia, Northern Ireland and Iraq Mclntyre was accused  of overcharging a US peace group for a security contract when he was running his own firm which employed a team of 20 to provide security to American clients, including the Iraqi ambassador to the US, and of overcharging US government for security services in Baghdad, Iraq. McIntyre left the Army in 2002 and set up security company called Quantum Risk. The eight counts of fraud McIntyre was charged with relate to claims that he overcharged a US peace group for a security contract when he was running Quantum Risk between December 2008 and July 2009. McIntyre's business closed in 2009, which followed by his enrolment in the Royal Military Police, for whom he served in Afghanistan.  In July 2012 McIntyre was arrested in uniform in an operational setting in Afghanistan, flown out of the country 45 minutes later, and then appeared in Westminster Magistrates Court in London 36 hours later. McIntyre faced eight counts of fraud concerning a contract with the United States Institute of Peace (USIP). It was alleged he overcharged the organisation by 100,000 US dollars (£65,000). After the US extradition request was approved by Home Secretary Theresa May, McIntyre appealed, submitting a report from the British Army's consultant psychiatrist confirming that he suffered from PTSD.
Todner commented that her firm will consider in detail the Secretary of State's conclusion and see whether they can seek Judicial Review of her decision.

References

External links
 
 

1952 births
Living people
People from Nuneaton
British women lawyers
20th-century British lawyers
21st-century British lawyers
21st-century British writers
21st-century British women writers
Alumni of the University of Exeter
Alumni of the University of Chester
British legal writers
People associated with computer security
English solicitors
20th-century women lawyers
21st-century women lawyers